The Alfa Romeo Twin Cam engine is an all-alloy inline-four engine series produced by Alfa Romeo from 1954 to 1994. In Italian it is known as the "bialbero" ("twin-shaft"), and has also been nicknamed the "Nord" (North) engine in reference to its being built in Arese, close to Milan, in the North of Italy and to distinguish it from the Alfa Romeo Boxer engine built in the South (Sud) for the Alfasud.

History 
The Twin Cam's predecessor appeared in the 1950 Alfa Romeo 1900 and was an under-square inline four cylinder with a cast-iron block, an aluminium alloy crossflow cylinder head with double overhead cams and a 90° included angle between intake and exhaust valves. Development of that engine was overseen by Orazio Satta Puliga who would also helm development of its successor. The 1952 Disco Volante had a 2-litre DOHC four cylinder engine with an aluminium block and sleeves, but this seems to have been a custom version of the 1900 engine rather than a prototype of the forthcoming Twin Cam. While the Twin Cam shared some features with the 1900 engine, it was a new design by Giuseppe Busso.

The Alfa Romeo Twin Cam engine debuted in the 1954 Giulietta. The engine featured:

 An aluminium alloy engine block with cast iron "wet" cylinder liners
 An aluminium alloy cylinder head with hemispherical combustion chambers.
 A forged steel crankshaft running in five main bearings
 Double overhead camshafts driven by a double row timing chain
 Direct valve actuation via camshafts on bucket tappets
 Two inclined valves per cylinder with a near-centrally located spark plug
 Inlet and exhaust valves separated by an angle of 80 degrees
 A large, flat, finned oil sump.

These features made the Twin Cam an advanced design for a production car engine of the mid-1950s and would, with minor variations, form the basis of all future versions of the engine.

The engine displaced  in the 1954 Giulietta. In 1960 another version of the Twin Cam was unveiled along with the Alfa Romeo Tipo 103 small car prototype. In adapting the engine to the transverse front-engine, front-wheel-drive layout the engine block and transaxle case were built as one unit. Only three of these engines were built.

On June 27, 1962 a larger Twin Cam appeared in the just-released Giulia.

Additional changes to this version included offsetting the big-end bearings on the connecting rods, and adding sodium-filled exhaust valves. In 1971 a  version was introduced for the 2000 GTV and 2000 Berlina. This largest production Twin Cam also had fewer teeth in the ring-gear and 6 bolts holding the flywheel instead of 8.

When the engine was adapted for use in the Alfetta in 1972, this necessitated a new oil pump and a change away from the finned sump used in the 105-series cars. While this was an aesthetic loss it may have been beneficial in other ways, as some owners reported that the old sump kept the engine and oil so cool that in cold weather it was sometimes necessary to block off the radiator airflow to raise the coolant temperature enough for the interior heater to be effective. Since the Alfetta also used a rear-mounted transaxle, there was no need for a pilot bearing in the engine.

The Twin Cam was the first production automobile engine to employ a form of Variable Valve Timing (VVT). The system that appeared on the 1980 Spider was an electro-mechanical system employing a variator to alter the phase but not duration of the intake camshaft.

Competition variations and specials
Alfa Romeo's Autodelta competition arm produced a multiplicity of variations on the Twin Cam for different racing classes and cars including the racing oriented GTA. Many of these engines used dual ignition systems (see "Twin Spark").

Even though Alfa Romeo never sold a production version of the Twin Cam with more than 8 valves, at least two 16 valve cylinder heads were available. A number of Autodelta engines had them, and another 16-valve head was developed by the tuner Franco Angelini.

Some Autodelta cylinder heads had an included angle between the intake and exhaust valves narrower than the 80° used in the majority of the production engines. These heads are called "testa stretta" (narrow head).

Some engines also had what was called a "monosleeve" liner, where all four cylinder bore liners are cast side-by-side in a single piece.

The 1959 Asardo 1500 AR-S was a one-off non-Alfa prototype that used a custom-built version of the Twin Cam.

Forced-induction versions
In 1967 the Alfa Romeo GTA SA debuted at the Geneva Motor Show. Built by Autodelta, the  Twin Cam engine was boosted by two superchargers driven by an engine-powered oil pump. Power was reported to be .

In 1979 the Alfa Romeo GTV Turbodelta was released. The 2 litre engine was augmented by a KKK turbocharger blowing through a pair of Dell'Orto DHLA40H pressurised carburetors and produced  in normal tune. This car was only offered until 1981 when Alfa Romeo left Group 4 to concentrate on Formula 1. 400 were built.

In 1984 Alfa released the Giulietta Turbodelta. Equipped with a  Twin Cam, dual carburetors and an Alfa Avio turbocharger the engine produced .

In 1986, a turbocharged version of the  single-plug engine developing  was used to create the Alfa Romeo 75 1.8 Turbo Quadrifoglio.

Twin Spark

Alfa Romeo's Twin Spark technology used dual ignition to fire two spark plugs in the cylinder head of each piston bore and was first used in the A.L.F.A. Grand Prix car of 1914. Racing versions of the Giulia engine, including the engine used in the GTA, featured a cylinder head with two spark plugs per cylinder. Twin Spark versions of the Twin Cam were also developed for 1750 and 2000 models used for racing.
 
In 1987 the production Alfa 75 2.0 Twin Spark was fitted with a Twin Spark head, which provided improved fuel ignition and allowed an improved combustion chamber shape with narrower angle between intake and exhaust valve. Although developed from the Twin Cam, few if any parts are interchangeable between Twin Spark engines and Twin Cams. For instance, while Twin Cams have six oilways leading to the cylinder head the Twin Sparks only have two, the timing chain cover is narrowed and the included angle between the valves is down to 46°.

After 1995 the 155 featured the 16-valve Twin Spark which, although sharing features with the previous engine, is a different design that is a member of Fiat's "Pratola Serra" engine series, while the 164 continued with the 8-valve Twin Spark until the end of production in 1997.

The production of the Alfa Romeo Twin Cam ended in 1997, by which time it had been gradually replaced since 1995 by the newer Fiat-based 16-valve Twin Spark engines.

Production sizes and applications

See also 
 Alfa Romeo V6 engine
 Fiat Twin Cam engine

References

Further reading
 
 
 
 
 
 
 
 

Twin Cam
Straight-four engines
Gasoline engines by model